Paraplegia is an impairment in motor or sensory function of the lower extremities. The word comes from Ionic Greek
"half-stricken". It is usually caused by spinal cord injury or a congenital condition that affects the neural (brain) elements of the spinal canal. The area of the spinal canal that is affected in paraplegia is either the thoracic, lumbar, or sacral regions. If four limbs are affected by paralysis, tetraplegia or quadriplegia is the correct term. If only one limb is affected, the correct term is monoplegia. Spastic paraplegia is a form of paraplegia defined by spasticity of the affected muscles, rather than flaccid paralysis.

Notable people with paraplegia

 Greg Abbott, Governor of Texas; former Texas Attorney General (paraplegic due to a 1984 freak accident when a falling oak tree hit him in the back)
 Peter Berry, American wheelchair basketball player for Alabama Crimson Tide
 Paul Darke, British academic and disability rights activist born with spina bifida.
  Deng Pufang, Chinese politician, son of Deng Xiaoping
 Daniel Dias, a Brazilian Paralympic swimmer.
 John Porter East (1931–1986), US politician who was partially paralyzed by polio in 1955
 Frank Gardner (journalist) (born 1961), prominent BBC journalist who became paralysed after being shot six times at close range by an Al-Qaeda gunman in Saudi Arabia
 Chuck Graham (1965–2020), United States politician injured in an automobile accident at age 16
 Tanni Grey-Thompson, paralympian born with spina bifida
 Rick Hansen, Canadian Paralympian who was paralyzed in a car crash at age 15
 John Hockenberry (born 1956), journalist and blogger
 Paul Johnson (producer) (1971–2021), American record producer and disc jockey who was shot accidentally
 Sharry Konopski (1967–2017), model and actress injured in a car accident
 Charles Krauthammer (1950–2018), conservative columnist and commentator
 Boris Kustodiev (1878–1927), Russian painter who became paraplegic due to tuberculosis of the vertebral column.
 James Langevin, US Congressman from Rhode Island who was shot accidentally at age 16.
 Linda Laubenstein (1947–1992), American physician who was left paraplegic after a childhood polio infection
 Craig Hart Neilsen (1941–2006), American gaming executive who founded Ameristar Casinos, Inc. and formed the Craig H. Neilsen Foundation to fund scientific research and quality-of-life programs for people living with spinal cord injuries.
 Ajith C. S. Perera (1956–2020), a Sri Lankan disability rights activist and former cricket umpire, who was paralyzed when a tree fell onto his moving car.
 Franklin D. Roosevelt (1882–1945), former president of the United States who, at the age of 39, was partially paralyzed by polio
 Wolfgang Schäuble, German politician injured in an assassination attempt in 1990
 Liesl Tesch (born 1969), an Australian wheelchair basketball player.
 George Corley Wallace, governor of Alabama and former candidate for the Democratic presidential nomination
 Colt Wynn, American bodybuilding champion
 Zhang Haidi, Chinese woman writer and translator, president of the China Disabled Persons' Federation (2008-).

See also
List of cases of Bell's palsy
List of people with quadriplegia

References

People with paraplegia

fi:Luettelo tunnetuista vyötäröstä alaspäin halvaantuneista ihmisistä